Avadhara (sometimes referred to as Auadhara; ; , Awadhara) is a climatological resort in Abkhazia, Georgia. Mount Avadhara elevation . Avadhara is surrounded by fir, spruce, and beech forests. The area experiences cool summers and relatively cold winters.

See also 
 Lake Ritsa
 Mamison Pass
 Avadhara River

References 

Populated places in Gudauta District